P. commune may refer to:
 Penicillium commune, a fungus species in the genus Penicillium
 Polytrichum commune, the common haircap moss, common hair moss or great goldilocks, a moss species

See also
 Commune (disambiguation)